CSCL Arctic Ocean is a container ship, operated by China Shipping Container Lines.
At the time of her construction she, and her four sister ships,  Globe, Pacific Ocean, Atlantic Ocean, and Indian Ocean, were the largest container ships afloat, each carrying 19,100 twenty-foot equivalent unit containers.  Half a dozen slightly larger vessels have been built, since then.  Chinese officials said the vessels cost $136 million each to build.

In May 2017 the vessel made a visit to the Baltic Sea. 
On May 19, 2017, the city of Gdańsk celebrated the arrival of the Arctic Ocean, as it marked the first time a container ship of its size had visited the port.
On May 22, 2017, she moored at JadeWeserPort, the container port of Wilhelmshaven, Germany, on the River Weser.

References

External links

Container ships
Merchant ships of China
2015 ships
Ships of COSCO Shipping